Ronald Michael Behagen (born January 14, 1951) is a retired American basketball player.

A 6'9" center from DeWitt Clinton High School in New York City, Behagen played basketball in junior college and at the University of Minnesota during the early 1970s. One of his teammates was future Baseball Hall-of-Famer Dave Winfield. After his college career ended in 1973, Behagen was drafted by the Kentucky Colonels in the 1973 American Basketball Association draft and by the Kansas City Kings in the first round of the 1973 NBA draft.

Behagen played seven seasons of professional basketball in the NBA as a member of the Kansas City Kings, New Orleans Jazz, Atlanta Hawks, Houston Rockets, Indiana Pacers, Detroit Pistons, New York Knicks, and Washington Bullets and in Italy for Antonini Siena.  He received NBA All-Rookie Team honors in 1974.  In his NBA career, he averaged 10.3 points and 7.0 rebounds per game.

Brawl with Ohio State
On January 25, 1972, Behagen was involved in one of the most serious on-court incidents in college basketball history when he and several teammates attacked Ohio State University's Luke Witte.  According to the Big Ten Conference's review of the game film, Witte appeared to elbow Minnesota guard Bobby Nix as the two teams headed to their locker rooms at halftime. As the game progressed, Ohio State established a 50–44 lead with less than a minute to play when Minnesota's Clyde Turner flagrantly fouled Witte during a layup attempt, knocking Witte to the floor. Corky Taylor of Minnesota helped Witte up, then kneed Witte in the groin.  A melee between the two teams ensued, and Behagen came off the bench to stomp Witte in the head, leaving him unconscious. Ohio State coach Fred Taylor described it as "the sorriest thing [he] ever saw in intercollegiate athletics." Behagen and Corky Taylor were suspended for the rest of that season, though Witte did not press charges against either.

Later years
On January 3, 2012, Behagen was sentenced to three years probation and ordered to pay restitution after pleading guilty to stealing money from a 68-year-old Atlanta woman suffering from Alzheimer's disease, Parkinson's disease, and dementia.  According to the Fulton County District Attorney's Office, Behagen received the woman's ATM card from her caretaker, Valla Rider.  Behagen withdrew $7,140 from the woman's bank account in 40 transactions between April 2011 and June 2011; all of the transactions were recorded on bank cameras. Rider had pleaded guilty to financial transaction card fraud in August 2011.

NBA career statistics

Regular season

|-
| align="left" | 1973–74
| align="left" | Kansas City-Omaha
| 80 || - || 25.7 || .432 || - || .764 || 7.1 || 1.7 || 0.7 || 0.5 || 11.0
|-
| align="left" | 1974–75
| align="left" | Kansas City-Omaha
| 81 || - || 27.2 || .399 || - || .754 || 7.3 || 1.9 || 0.7 || 0.5 || 10.7
|-
| align="left" | 1975–76
| align="left" | New Orleans
| 66 || - || 26.3 || .446 || - || .804 || 8.4 || 2.1 || 1.0 || 0.4 || 11.5
|-
| align="left" | 1976–77
| align="left" | New Orleans
| 60 || - || 19.5 || .418 || - || .714 || 7.2 || 1.4 || 0.7 || 0.3 || 8.6
|-
| align="left" | 1977–78
| align="left" | Atlanta
| 26 || - || 22.0 || .470 || - || .729 || 6.7 || 1.3 || 1.2 || 0.5 || 11.0
|-
| align="left" | 1977–78
| align="left" | Houston
| 3 || - || 11.0 || .636 || - || .000 || 2.3 || 0.7 || 0.0 || 0.0 || 4.7
|-
| align="left" | 1977–78
| align="left" | Indiana
| 51 || - || 22.2 || .408 || - || .727 || 6.5 || 1.3 || 0.6 || 0.4 || 11.2
|-
| align="left" | 1978–79
| align="left" | Detroit
| 1 || - || 1.0 || .000 || - || .000 || 0.0 || 0.0 || 0.0 || 0.0 || 0.0
|-
| align="left" | 1978–79
| align="left" | New York
| 5 || - || 7.6 || .417 || - || 1.000 || 2.2 || 0.4 || 0.4 || 0.0 || 2.4
|-
| align="left" | 1978–79
| align="left" | Kansas City
| 9 || - || 14.0 || .460 || - || .727 || 3.4 || 0.6 || 0.2 || 0.1 || 6.0
|-
| align="left" | 1979–80
| align="left" | Washington
| 6 || - || 10.7 || .391 || .000 || .833 || 2.3 || 1.2 || 0.0 || 0.7 || 3.8
|- class="sortbottom"
| style="text-align:center;" colspan="2"| Career
| 388 || - || 23.5 || .425 || .000 || .754 || 7.0 || 1.6 || 0.7 || 0.4 || 10.3
|}

Playoffs

|-
| align="left" | 1974–75
| align="left" | Kansas City-Omaha
| 6 || - || 18.0 || .512 || - || 1.000 || 4.8 || 1.0 || 0.2 || 0.3 || 7.8
|-
| align="left" | 1979–80
| align="left" | Washington
| 2 || - || 7.0 || .286 || .000 || .000 || 1.0 || 1.5 || 0.0 || 0.0 || 2.0
|- class="sortbottom"
| style="text-align:center;" colspan="2"| Career
| 8 || - || 15.3 || .480 || .000 || 1.000 || 3.9 || 1.1 || 0.1 || 0.3 || 6.4
|}

References

1951 births
Living people
Basketball players from New York City
African-American basketball players
All-American college men's basketball players
American expatriate basketball people in Italy
American men's basketball players
Atlanta Hawks players
Centers (basketball)
Detroit Pistons players
Houston Rockets players
Indiana Pacers players
Kansas City Kings draft picks
Kansas City Kings players
Kentucky Colonels draft picks
New Orleans Jazz players
Mens Sana Basket players
Minnesota Golden Gophers men's basketball players
New York Knicks players
Power forwards (basketball)
Southern Idaho Golden Eagles men's basketball players
Washington Bullets players
DeWitt Clinton High School alumni
21st-century African-American people
20th-century African-American sportspeople